The 2016 BMW Malaysian Open was a women's tennis tournament played on outdoor hard courts. It was the 7th edition of the Malaysian Open and was an International tournament on the 2016 WTA Tour. The tournament took place from 29 February to 6 March 2016 at the Kuala Lumpur Golf & Country Club (KLGCC).

Points and prize money distribution

Points distribution

Prize money

Singles main-draw entrants

Seeds

1 Rankings as of February 22, 2016.

Other entrants 
The following players received wildcards into the singles main draw:
  Sabine Lisicki
  Elina Svitolina
  Roberta Vinci
  Zhang Ling

The following players received entry from the qualifying draw:
  Miyu Kato
  Barbora Krejčíková
  Luksika Kumkhum
  Risa Ozaki
  Yang Zhaoxuan
  Zhu Lin

Withdrawals 
Before the tournament
  Alison Riske → replaced by  Chang Kai-chen
  Anastasija Sevastova → replaced by  Jana Čepelová
  Ajla Tomljanović → replaced by  Wang Yafan

Doubles main-draw entrants

Seeds 

Rankings as of February 22, 2016.

Other entrants 
The following pair received wildcard into the doubles main draw:
  Nao Hibino /  Zhang Ling
  Liu Fangzhou /  Jawairiah Noordin

Finals

Singles 

  Elina Svitolina defeated  Eugenie Bouchard 6–7(5–7), 6–4, 7–5

Doubles 

  Varatchaya Wongteanchai /  Yang Zhaoxuan defeated  Liang Chen /  Wang Yafan 4–6, 6–4, [10–7]

References

External links
 Official website

Malaysian Open
Malaysian Open (tennis)
2016 in Malaysian tennis